Involucropyrenium is a genus of lichens in the family Verrucariaceae. It has nine species. The genus was circumscribed by Austrian lichenologist Othmar Breuss in 1996, with Involucropyrenium waltheri assigned as the type species.

Species
Involucropyrenium breussii 
Involucropyrenium llimonae 
Involucropyrenium nuriense 
Involucropyrenium pusillum 
Involucropyrenium romeanum 
Involucropyrenium sbarbaronis 
Involucropyrenium terrigenum 
Involucropyrenium tremniacense 
Involucropyrenium waltheri

References

Verrucariales
Eurotiomycetes genera
Lichen genera
Taxa described in 1996